The 2020–21 Pacific Tigers men's basketball team represented the University of the Pacific during the 2020–21 NCAA Division I men's basketball season. The Tigers were led by fifth-year head coach Damon Stoudamire and played their home games at the Alex G. Spanos Center in Stockton, California as members of the West Coast Conference.

Previous season 
The Tigers finished the 2019–20 season 23–10, 11–5 in WCC play to finish in a tie for third place. They lost in the third round of the WCC tournament to San Francisco.

Offseason

Departures

Incoming transfers

Recruiting Class of 2020
There was no recruiting class of 2020.

Recruiting Class of 2021

Roster

Schedule and results

|-
!colspan=9 style=| Non-conference regular season

 

|-
!colspan=9 style=| WCC regular season

|-
!colspan=9 style=| WCC tournament

Source:

References

Pacific Tigers men's basketball seasons
Pacific
Pacific
Pacific